Al Watan Daily was a daily English-language newspaper published in Kuwait.

History and profile
The first issue of Al-Watan Daily was published on 3 March 2008. The paper was established and was printed by the Dar Al-Watan publishing house, which also publishes the Arabic language daily newspaper Al Watan. In 2006 Dar Al Watan had published the English language daily "The Daily Star – Kuwait edition" in cooperation with The Daily Star.

On 8 November 2009 Al-Watan Daily launched its Journalism and Media Club (JAM), which was aimed at introducing youth to the process of coordinating and publishing a newspaper. 16 students from local Kuwaiti schools were selected to participate in the initial five-week program, which concluded with the publication of the first JAM issue on 13 December 2009.

In January 2013 Al-Watan Daily announced that it "will temporary be off the market for approx. three months due to business development and restructuring".

References

2008 establishments in Kuwait
2013 disestablishments in Kuwait
Newspapers established in 2008
Publications disestablished in 2013
Newspapers published in Kuwait
Mass media in Kuwait City
English-language newspapers published in Arab countries
Defunct newspapers published in Kuwait